This is a listing of all those that have served as the Mayor of the City of Curitiba, Brazil.

See also
 
 Timeline of Curitiba
 
 List of mayors of largest cities in Brazil (in Portuguese)
 List of mayors of capitals of Brazil (in Portuguese)

References
 List of Mayors of Curitiba from Curitiba's City Hall's website 

Curitiba